Samson and Delilah is a circa 1495-1500 glue tempera on canvas painting by Andrea Mantegna, now in the National Gallery, London.

It is one of his works in the grisaille style between 1495 and his death. Its format and technique are similar to Judith with the Head of Holofernes (National Gallery of Ireland).

Bibliography
 Mauro Lucco (ed), Mantegna a Mantova 1460-1506, exhibition catalogue, Skira Milano, 2006
 Stefano Zuffi, Il Quattrocento, Electa, Milano 2004.

External links
http://www.nationalgallery.org.uk/paintings/andrea-mantegna-samson-and-delilah

1490s paintings
Collections of the National Gallery, London
Paintings by Andrea Mantegna